The Border Guard Unit (acronym: BGU) is a national security and paramilitary unit of the Customs Excise and Preventive Service Division of the Ghana Revenue Authority and the Ghana Armed Forces (GAF). Established in October 1964, BGU's primary role is to guard Ghana's international borders during peacetime and prevent trans-border crime.

History
In October 1964, the Border Guard Unit was formed as a police unit led by an assistant commissioner of police. The BGU acted as customs agents examining passengers and baggage aboard ships and aircraft.

In 1988 the BGU was re-integrated into the Customs Excise and Preventive Service as a military unit. BGU designs and implements effective strategies and programmes to facilitate the movement of people across Ghana's international borders.

Objectives

The Border Guard Unit (BGU) ensures the security of Ghana's international borders and entry and exit points against illegal immigration and cross-border criminals. Its tasks include:
 Physical patrolling of international borders 
 Preventing illegal emigration
 Preventing drug trafficking and human trafficking 
 Preventing cross-border smuggling
 Preventing wildlife smuggling 
 Reporting on suspected subversive activities 
 Preparedness to act as the first line of defence against external aggressors

Border patrol operations and corporate operations

The BGU's primary operation is detection and apprehension of illegal aliens and smugglers of aliens at or near the land borders. Some of the major BGU operational activities include maintaining traffic checkpoints and security checkpoints along highways (Ghana Road Network) leading from border areas, conducting snap checks and anti-smuggling within Ghana. These BGU operational activities are performed with the use of UCAVs, UAVs, attack helicopters, armoured fighting vehicles, pick-up vehicles, and all purpose motorbikes .

Customs operations
The BGU physically examines containerized goods at Boankra Inland Port, Akosombo Port, Takoradi Harbour and Tema Harbour. BGU is working to streamline and fully automate customs processes and procedures under the Ghana Customs Management System (GCMS) and the Ghana Community Network (GCNET).

References

External links
Border Security in Ghana: Challenges and Prospects

Ghanaian intelligence agencies
Law enforcement agencies of Ghana